Bisheh (also Romanized as Bīsheh) is a village in Dehshir Rural District, in the Central District of Taft County, Yazd Province, Iran. At the 2006 census, its population was 39, in 15 families.

References 

Populated places in Taft County